Entourage is an American comedy-drama television series created for HBO by Doug Ellin, who also serves as an executive producer along with Mark Wahlberg, Stephen Levinson, Dennis Biggs, Rob Weiss and Ally Musika. The series, loosely based on Wahlberg's own experiences of the film industry, follows Vincent Chase (Adrian Grenier), a New York born actor living in Los Angeles as he struggles with the ups and downs of a career in Hollywood. He is aided, and often hindered, by his entourage, which consists of his half-brother and struggling actor Johnny "Drama" Chase (Kevin Dillon), his childhood friend and manager Eric "E" Murphy (Kevin Connolly), his ruthless  agent Ari Gold (Jeremy Piven) and his other long-time friend Turtle (Jerry Ferrara).

Entourage premiered on HBO on July 18, 2004, and aired its final episode on September 11, 2011. A total of 96 episodes were aired over eight seasons. On June 3, 2015, a feature-length film of the same name was released by Warner Bros. Pictures, and continued the narrative following the series finale.

Series overview

Episodes

Season 1 (2004)

Season 2 (2005)

Season 3 (2006–07)

Season 4 (2007)

Season 5 (2008)

Season 6 (2009)

Season 7 (2010)

Season 8 (2011)

Film (2015)

References

External links
 
 

Lists of American sitcom episodes
Lists of American comedy-drama television series episodes